The 2012 Consadole Sapporo season is Consadole Sapporo's 1st season in J. League Division 1 since 2008, hence the club's 8th overall in the top flight. Consadole Sapporo are also competing in the 2012 Emperor's Cup and 2012 J. League Cup.

Players

Competitions

J. League

League table

Matches

J. League Cup

Emperor's Cup

References

Consadole Sapporo
Hokkaido Consadole Sapporo seasons